Mosiera is a genus of shrubs and small trees in the family Myrtaceae, first described as a genus in 1933. It is native to Mexico, Guatemala, the West Indies, Brazil, and Florida.

The genus was named in honor of Charles A. Mosier

Accepted species

References

External links

Myrtaceae
Myrtaceae genera
Taxa named by John Kunkel Small
Neotropical realm flora